Creatonotos interrupta is a moth of the family Erebidae. It was described by Carl Linnaeus in his 1767 12th edition of Systema Naturae. It is often listed as a synonym of Creatonotos gangis, but the identity is unclear.

In The Fauna of British India, Including Ceylon and Burma: Moths Volume II, the species is described as follows:

References

Spilosomina
Moths described in 1767
Taxa named by Carl Linnaeus